A by-election was held for the New South Wales Legislative Assembly electorate of East Sydney on 20 March 1867 because Charles Cowper resigned due to financial difficulties.

Dates

Result

Charles Cowper resigned due to financial difficulties.

See also
Electoral results for the district of East Sydney
List of New South Wales state by-elections

References

1867 elections in Australia
New South Wales state by-elections
1860s in New South Wales